Coenocyathus is a genus of cnidarians belonging to the family Caryophylliidae.

The genus has almost cosmopolitan distribution.

Species:

Coenocyathus anthophyllites 
Coenocyathus bowersi 
Coenocyathus brooki 
Coenocyathus caribbeana 
Coenocyathus cylindricus 
Coenocyathus goreaui 
Coenocyathus hannibali 
Coenocyathus humanni 
Coenocyathus parvulus 
Coenocyathus sebroecki 
Coenocyathus simplex 
Coenocyathus taurinensis

References

Caryophylliidae
Scleractinia genera